Antonius Adrianus Gerardus Maria "Ronald" van Raak (born 30 October 1969) is a Dutch politician, non-fiction writer and former academic. A member of the Socialist Party, he has been a member of the House of Representatives since 30 November 2006. He focuses on matters of home affairs, kingdom relations, the royal house and general affairs. From 2003 to 2006, he was a Senator of the Netherlands.

Biography 
Van Raak is of a working-class background; his father was a truck driver. He grew up in his native village and attended secondary education in Tilburg. Afterwards he studied both social history and philosophy at Erasmus University Rotterdam and got promoted in humanities at the University of Amsterdam.

On 1 April 2000 he joined the Socialist Party and started to work at SP's think tank. Three years later he became director.

In 2003 he was elected into the Dutch Senate and was a member from 10 June that year till 28 November 2006. In November 2006 he was elected into the Dutch House of Representatives. The same month he changed positions, instead of being director he became SP's think tank chairman.

From 2001 to 2005 he also taught history at the University of Amsterdam.

Bibliography 
 2011: De Eerste Kamer. De andere kant van het Binnenhof: toen, nu, straks (editor, with Arjan Vliegenthart)
 2010: Woorden in de strijd (editor, with Sj. van der Velden)
 2008: Socialisten. Mensen achter de idealen
 2008: Modern socialisme
 2006: Het rijke rooie leven. Verhalen over socialisme in Nederland
 2004: Socialisme, what's left? (editor, essays)
 2003: Oud licht op nieuwe zaken. Adviezen van Erasmus, Spinoza, Thorbecke, Multatuli, Huizinga en anderen (essays) 
 2001-2003: De uitverkoop van Nederland (with N. Schouten)
 2001: In naam van het volmaakte: conservatisme in Nederland in de negentiende eeuw van Gerrit Jan Mulder tot Jan Heemskerk Azn. (dissertation)
 1997: De moderne dwaas. Bertolt Brecht en de moderne zingeving

References 
  Parlement.com biography

External links 

  House of Representatives biography

1969 births
Living people
Dutch essayists
20th-century Dutch historians
Dutch political consultants
Dutch speechwriters
Dutch republicans
Erasmus University Rotterdam alumni
Members of the House of Representatives (Netherlands)
Members of the Senate (Netherlands)
Writers from Amsterdam
People from Hilvarenbeek
Social historians
Socialist Party (Netherlands) politicians
University of Amsterdam alumni
Academic staff of the University of Amsterdam
21st-century Dutch politicians
21st-century Dutch historians